Dasht-e Shad (also Romanized as Dasht-e Shād; also known as Dast-e Shā, Dast-e Shāh, Dast Shāh, and Destisha) is a village in Rezvan Rural District, Kalpush District, Meyami County, Semnan Province, Iran. At the 2006 census, its population was 1,224, in 288 families.

References 

Populated places in Meyami County